The American Character Doll Company was an American toy company specializing in dolls. Their most popular dolls included "Tiny Tears," "Tressy," "Butterball Doll", "Sweet Sue," and "Toodles." Founded in 1919, the company's fortunes peaked in the mid-20th century, as they sold millions of dolls exclusively to retailers and mail order houses such as Sears and Montgomery Ward. The company was the first to produce mass-marketed rubber dolls in the United States. American Character Dolls went bankrupt in 1968, with their assets acquired by the Ideal Toy Company.

History

Corporate history 

The American Doll and Toy Corporation was established in 1919 by Russian Jewish immigrant brothers Jacob and Max Brock, and their partner Ed Schaefaer, with many of the Brock relatives occupying key positions at the company. The company used the trade names "Aceedeecee" and "ACDC". American Character Dolls' factory was in Brooklyn; the company operated a store on East 17th Street in New York City in the late 1920s.  By the late 1930s, the company's manufacturing plant, comprising 130,000 square feet, was in Easthampton, Massachusetts.

The company made the news in 1937 when it was ordered by the Federal Trade Commission to stop claiming that its patented "paratex" (a hard rubber made from a "secret formula") was superior to composition dolls (popularly made by American Character's competitor the Ideal Toy Company).

In 1951, American Character partnered with competitors the Ideal Toy Company and the Alexander Doll Company to establish the United States-Israeli Toy and Plastic Corporation, designed to produce material for toys in Israel and the U.S. The new corporation's offices shared space with American Character.

In 1954, American Character Dolls established a $2,000 annual fellowship at Teachers College, Columbia University, known as the Frances Horwich Graduate Fellowship in Early Childhood Education. In 1954 the company was awarded a patent for a doll that "breathes, sheds tears, drinks from a bottle, blows bubbles, and even smokes."

By 1967 the company's fortunes were in decline, with unsecured claims said to be approximately $1.4 million. Settlements were arranged in March and June 1967, and the company continued to operate on a limited scale. Shortly thereafter, in 1968, American Character Dolls filed for bankruptcy and went out of business. Molds for some toys were sold to Mattel and Ideal Toy Company, which acquired the defunct company's dyes, patents, and trademarks.

Product history 

American Character dolls were thought to be well-made, with good quality costumes. Early dolls were made of composition; one of their first lines of mother and character dolls were introduced in 1923 and called "Petite;" they remained popular into the 1930s.

The Puggy and Sally Campbell Kids children dolls were introduced in 1928; they were based on the cartoon characters designed by Grace Drayton.

American Character released a limited number of celebrity dolls over the years, beginning with "Lucky Aviation Kid" in 1927, a Charles Lindbergh doll wearing a brown aviator suit and flight cap, with a Spirit of St. Louis model plane ribbon, white socks and brown shoes. In the 1930s, the company released the celebrity doll "Carol Ann Beery," based on the child actress of the same name. The Kathryn Grayson autographed celebrity doll was produced in the late 1940s.

American Character switched their formula from composition to their branded "Paratex" in the mid-1930s.

Celebrity dolls released in the 1950s included Alice In Wonderland (1952), "Annie Oakley" (1954), "Eloise," and a series of I Love Lucy dolls (1952), the most popular of which was the baby doll later known as "Little Ricky." The 14" vinyl doll came dressed in a flannel gown and cried "real tears." (In 1952 stars Lucille Ball and husband Desi Arnaz were expecting a child.)

American Character's most popular doll was Tiny Tears, introduced in 1950 and remaining in production through the rest of the company's existence. The baby doll's distinguishing feature was her ability to shed tears from two tiny holes on either side of her nose when her stomach was pressed after being filled with water from her baby bottle. Tiny Tears became one of the most popular dolls of the 1950s, due in part to television ads featuring a young Patty Duke that aired on popular children's shows such as the highly influential Ding Dong School with Frances Horwich.

"Sweet Sue," introduced in 1951, was popular through the decade into the early 1960s. A pre-teen plastic doll, she came in a variety of sizes. In 1957, American Character marketed "Sweet Sue Sophisticate," a 14" or 20" fashion doll. The "Toodles" multi-jointed plastic doll — able to "kneel, sit, play and assume 1,000 different positions" — was introduced in 1955 and became a big seller for American Character, including its associated products like "Toodles Toddler" (1955-1959), "Teeny Toodles" (1959-1960), and "Tommy Toodles" (1959-1960). "Toni," released in 1958, was a fashion doll for Toni hair products, sold by Gillette. Toni, also marketed as "Cha Cha" or "High Society," was popular into the 1960s.

Tressy, introduced in 1963, was a fashion doll with a feature to adjust the length of its hair. The doll was invented and patented by modern furniture designer Jesse Dean and his wife, Diana. It was first sold as an 11½" fashion doll similar to Mattel's Barbie. Tressy featured a long swatch of hair that could be pulled out of the top of the doll's head by pushing a button on the doll's midriff; that mechanism allowed children the ability to comb the hair in a variety of styles. American Character clearly intended that Tressy's "growing" hair feature would give the doll a marketing edge over its blockbuster competitor, Barbie. Tressy was popular from the outset, selling into its retirement in 1965. Unlike Mattel, which maintained sole manufacturing and global distribution rights on its bestselling Barbie doll, American Character allowed the Regal Toy Company of Canada to manufacture and sell its own version of Tressy, which had heavier eye and facial makeup. There was also a Palitoy Tressy sold in the United Kingdom and a Bella Tressy made and marketed by Societe Bella in France. "Cricket" was marketed by the American Character Doll Co. in 1964 as Tressy's cousin.

American Character focused on talking dolls in the early 1960s, with such models as "Little Miss Echo" (1962-1964), "Baby Babbles" (1963), and "Baby Says," (1963). The only celebrity dolls American Character released in the 1960s were the Cartwright Family (1966), based on Bonanza.

The company's final big product launches were "Whimsies" (1960–1961), a line of dolls with names like Bashful Bride, Dixie the Pixie, Fanny (an angel), Hedda Get Bedda (a multi-face doll, with three faces), Hilda the Hillbilly, Lena the Cleaner, Miss Take, Monk, Polly the Lady Raggie, Simon, Strong Man, Suzie the Snoozie, Tillie the Talker, Wheeler Dealer, Zack the Sack, and Zero the Hero (a football player); and "Tiny Whimsies" (1966), a line of 7-1/2" dolls with names like Lites Out (nightgown), I'm Yours (bride), Fly with Me (witch), Swing It (dancer), Love Me (red pantsuit), and I'm Hooked (groom); and a line of 6" dolls with names like Pixie, Swinger, Granny, Lites out, Minnie Mod, Jump'n, and Go-Go.

Dolls manufactured by American Character

1920s 
 Baby Petite/Teenie Weenie (1925) — 11"-15" baby doll also known as "Bye-Lo" or "Tynie Baby"
 Bottletot (1926) — 14" baby doll, also marketed as "Happy Tot," "Marvel Tot," and "Toddle Tot"
 Campbell Kids (1928–1929) — 12" dolls designed by Grace Drayton, sometimes called "Dolly Dingle" after the paper dolls also designed by Drayton. Came in two versions: "Sally" and "Puggy"
 Lucky Aviation Kid (1927) — 14" Charles Lindbergh doll
 Mama / Petite (1922–1930s) — line of mother and character dolls varying in size from 12"-24"; also known as "Wonder Baby"

1930s 
 Smiling Sally (1930s) — came in 12," 15," or 16" versions
 Sally Joy (1930s) — 18-24" doll 
 Carol Ann Beery (1935) — 13-1/2" or 16" doll
 Sally Jane (1936-1938) —15," 17," 19," and 22"-tall Shirley Temple look-a-like doll made from "Paratex"

1940s 
 Little Love (1942-1947) — 15", 18" Bye-Lo Baby or Tynie Baby look-a-like
 Pre Sweet Sue (1947) — 17-18" doll; later made into Kathryn Grayson autographed celebrity doll

1950s 
 Alice In Wonderland (1952) — 18" doll; essentially Sweet Sue in a blue dress with white pinafore
 Annie Oakley (1954) — 15-25" doll; essentially Sweet Sue in an outfit of green denim culottes, matching bolero, satin blouse and scarf, felt hat, holster with two guns and cowboy boots
 Baby Sue (1957) — 17" or 23" hard plastic doll
 Betsy McCall (1957-1959) — 8"-36" hard plastic doll; also marketed as her "cousin" Sandy McCall
 Chuckles (1952-1961) — 18-19, 22" vinyl doll
 Eloise (1958-1959) — 21" cloth doll named after the series of children's books by Kay Thompson and Hilary Knight
 Life Size Sweet Sue (1955-1956) — 24" and 31" doll
 I Love Lucy Baby (1952–1956) — baby doll later known as "Little Ricky"
 I Love Lucy Lucille Ball (1952) — 28" cloth doll with a hard plastic painted face, red bangs showing beneath her kerchief, big blue eyes, wearing her red and white striped blouse, an apron with "I Love Lucy" printed on it, with two heart shaped pockets and red peddle pusher pants
 I Love Lucy Ricky (1953–1955) — vinyl doll with molded hair and sleep eyes in various outfits
 Jimmy John (1954) — 18" "magic skin" doll that cooed when the tummy was pressed
 Sweet Sue (1951-1961) — 14," 15," 18"-21", 24," and 31" pre-teen plastic doll
 Sweet Sue Sophisticate (1957) — 14" or 20" fashion doll 
 Teeny Toodles (1959-1960) — 11" vinyl five-piece-jointed doll
 Tiny Tears (1950–1968) — "crying" baby doll in 11-1/2," 13 1/2," 16," and 20" sizes 
 Tommy Toodles (1959-1960) — 22-23" doll marketed as Toodles' brother 
 Toni (1958–1960s) — 10," 14," 20," and 25" fashion doll for Toni hair products (Gillette) made from the same face mold as Sweet Sue Sophisticate; also marketed as "Cha Cha" or "High Society"
 Toodles (1955-1960s) — 19-30" plastic multi-jointed doll
 Toodles Toddler (1955-1959) — 19-1/2", 21," and 24" vinyl multi-jointed doll also known as "Toodles The Action Doll"

1960s 
 Baby Babbles (1963) — 23" doll with a foam-covered voice box that says phrases 
 Baby Says (1963) — 17" speaking doll with eleven different phrases (battery-operated)
 Butterball (1961) — 19" or 23"  soft vinyl Magi-form doll
 Cartwright Family (1966) — 8" celebrity dolls from Bonanza: Ben, Hoss, Little Joe, and Adam
 Chuckles (1961) — big girl doll
 Cricket (1964) — fashion with growing hair feature; Tressy's "cousin" also known as "Toots"
 Little Miss Echo (1962-1964) — 30" hard plastic talker doll with battery operated tape recorder
 Mary Makeup (1964) — Tressy's friend without the grow-hair feature
 Mini-Whimsies (1966) — 6- 7 1/2" molded vinyl line of dolls; successor to Whimsies
 Popi (1963) — 11" pop-apart fashion doll with three separate wigs and a cut-and-drape non-sew dress
 Pouty Penny (1966) — 13," 20," or 22" baby doll also marketed as "Freckles"
 Pre-Teen (1963) — 14" grow-hair vinyl doll with a button on the tummy that enabled the doll's hair to grow or retract; only made in 1963, then was discontinued to make way for Tressy
 Sally Says (1963-1965) — 18"-19" vinyl toddler doll with a battery operated talker
 Snip n' Tuck (1966) — mannequin Popi doll in a frame, with fabric and accessories for children to design and make their own non-sew clothing
 Suzie the Snoozie (1960) — 22" sleeping doll
 Teenie Tiny Tears (1964) — 12" doll
 Tiny Whimsies (1966)
 Toodle-Loo (1961) — 17-18" magic foam fully jointed vinyl doll
 Tressy (1963–1967) — fashion doll with growing hair feature; also marketed as "Magic Makeup Tressy" and "Black Magic Makeup Tressy"
 Whimsies (1960–1961)

References

External links 
 Website devoted to Whimsies line of dolls

Doll manufacturing companies
Toy companies of the United States
Defunct toy manufacturers
Defunct manufacturing companies based in New York City
American companies established in 1919
Manufacturing companies disestablished in 1968
Ideal Toy Company
Toy companies established in 1919